Zingis is a 1768 tragedy by the British writer Alexander Dow. It is set during the reign of Tamerlane.

The original Drury Lane cast included Charles Holland as Tamerlane, Francis Aickin as Zingis, John Hayman Packer as Aunac, Samuel Reddish as Zemouca, Thomas Jefferson as Cubla, John Palmer as Zena, Charles Bannister as Nevian, Richard Hurst as Sidasco and Elizabeth Younge as Ovisa.

References

Bibliography
 Nicoll, Allardyce. A History of English Drama 1660–1900: Volume III. Cambridge University Press, 2009.
 Hogan, C.B (ed.) The London Stage, 1660–1800: Volume V. Southern Illinois University Press, 1968.

1768 plays
Scottish plays
Tragedy plays
West End plays